Vitamin D-binding protein (DBP), also/originally known as gc-globulin (group-specific component), is a protein that in humans is encoded by the GC gene. DBP is genetically the oldest member of the albuminoid family and appeared early in the evolution of vertebrates.

Structure 
Human GC is a glycosylated alpha-globulin, ~58 kDa in size. Its 458 amino acids are coded for by 1690 nucleotides on chromosome 4 (4q11–q13). The primary structure contains 28 cysteine residues forming multiple disulfide bonds. GC contains 3 domains. Domain 1 is composed of 10 alpha helices, domain 2 of 9, and domain 3 of 4.

Function 
Vitamin D-binding protein belongs to the albumin gene family, together with human serum albumin and alpha-fetoprotein. It is a multifunctional protein found in plasma, ascitic fluid, cerebrospinal fluid and on the surface of many cell types. 

It is able to bind the various forms of vitamin D including ergocalciferol (vitamin D2) and cholecalciferol (vitamin D3), the 25-hydroxylated forms (calcifediol), and the active hormonal product, 1,25-dihydroxyvitamin D (calcitriol).  The major proportion of vitamin D in blood is bound to this protein.  It transports vitamin D metabolites between skin, liver and kidney, and then on to the various target tissues.

As Gc protein-derived macrophage activating factor it is a Macrophage Activating Factor (MAF) that has been tested for use as a cancer treatment that would activate macrophages against cancer cells.

Interactive pathway map

Production
It is synthesized by hepatic parenchymal cells and secreted into the blood circulation.

Regulation 

The transcription factors HFN1α is a positive regulator while HFN1β is a dominant negative regulator of DBP expression.

Variation 
Many genetic variants of the GC gene are known. They produce 6 main haplotypes and 3 main protein variants (Gc1S, Gc1F and Gc2). The genetic variations are associated with differences in circulating 25-hydroxyvitamin D levels. They have been proposed to account for some of the differences in vitamin D status in different ethnic groups, and have been found to correlate with the response to vitamin D supplementation.

References

Further reading

External links 
 

Vitamin D